CFDA-FM is a Canadian radio station, broadcasting an adult contemporary format at 101.9 FM in Victoriaville, Quebec. It shares the programming of sister station CKLD-FM in Thetford Mines.

The stations air the same programming at all times, although both stations produce a portion of the shared broadcast schedule from separate studios. Their CHR sister station CFJO-FM also produces programming in both cities, although it serves the region from a single 100-kilowatt transmitter.

History
The station was launched by Radio Victoriaville on October 19, 1951, airing on 1380 AM. It was sold to François Labbé's Radio-Mégantic in 1970, becoming a Radio-Canada affiliate as part of the Réseau des Appalaches from 1972 to 1979.

The station subsequently converted to its current FM frequency in 1999.

In April 2014, Montreal-based Attraction Radio announced plans to acquire all of Réseau des Appalaches' stations, including CFDA-FM; the decision is currently awaiting CRTC approval.

Pierre Bruneau, the current anchor of TVA's daytime newscasts, worked for CFDA early in his career.

References

External links
Plaisir 101,9
 

Fda
Fda
Fda
Victoriaville
Radio stations established in 1951
1951 establishments in Quebec